Elizabeth Hubbard (born December 22, 1933) is an American actress, known for her role as Dr. Althea Davis on the NBC daytime soap opera, The Doctors (1964–69, 1970–77, 1981–82), for which she received Daytime Emmy Award for Outstanding Lead Actress in a Drama Series in 1974,  and as powerful businesswoman Lucinda Walsh on the CBS soap opera, As the World Turns (1984-2010) for which she was nominated an Daytime Emmy Award eight times. Hubbard also starred in films I Never Sang for My Father (1970), The Bell Jar (1979) and Ordinary People (1980), and received another Emmy Award for playing Edith Wilson in the television film First Ladies Diaries: Edith Wilson (1976).

Personal life
Hubbard was born in New York, New York, to Elizabeth Wright Hubbard and Benjamin Alldritt Hubbard. Her mother, a physician, was a pioneer in homeopathy and one of the first women to earn a medical degree from Columbia University. She had two brothers, Theodore and Merle, an opera talent manager.

She attended Radcliffe College, and graduated summa cum laude. She pursued her theatrical education at the Royal Academy of Dramatic Art (RADA) in London, where she was the first American to receive the school's silver medal. She was married to furrier David Bennett from 1970 to 1972; they had one child, a son, Jeremy Bennett (born September 20, 1971).

Career
Hubbard began that career in 1962, starring as Anne Fletcher on the soap opera, Guiding Light. The following year, she joined the cast of The Edge of Night as Carol Kramer for another short stint. She starred in the play The Physicists for which she received 1965 Clarence Derwent Awards for Most Promising Female. In 1964, she originated the role of Dr. Althea Davis on NBC's year-old soap opera The Doctors. Hubbard played the role until October 1969, when she left to pursue a career in Hollywood. She returned to the role as of October 1, 1970 and continued the role until 1977. She returned again in 1981 and remained with the show until its cancellation in 1982. In 1974, Hubbard was awarded the first Daytime Emmy Award for Outstanding Lead Actress in a Drama Series. Hubbard's pairing with the character of Dr. Nick Bellini (Gerald Gordon) made them one of the most popular romantic couples on the soaps, dominating the show's storyline during the later half of the 1960s and for most of the 1970s.

In 1970, Hubbard made her big screen debut in the Academy Awards-nominated drama film, I Never Sang for My Father opposite Melvyn Douglas and Gene Hackman. In 1976, Hubbard won an additional Daytime Emmy Award for her portrayal of Edith Wilson in the television film First Ladies Diaries: Edith Wilson. She also appeared in films The Bell Jar (1979), Ordinary People (1980), Cold River (1982), Center Stage (2000) and The Treatment (2006).

After The Doctors was cancelled, Hubbard joined the cast of One Life to Live for the recurring role of society matron Estelle Chadwick for 1983 to 1983. In 1984, she joined As the World Turns as businesswoman Lucinda Walsh. She was nominated nine times for a Daytime Emmy for the role. Hubbard left the program in 1999 (due to a disagreement over the character's direction) but was persuaded to return several months later by the show's new executive producer. Hubbard was featured in a prominent storyline in 2005 when her character was diagnosed with cancer. She was in the show's 50th anniversary episode in April 2006, and stayed with the show until its final episode in September 2010.

In July 2009 she started a recurring role on the Dutch soap Goede Tijden, Slechte Tijden (Good Times, Bad Times), and played the role of Sair Poindexter, an American sexologist and mother of the Irene Huygens (Anita Donk) character. Hubbard, who traveled frequently to the Dutch province of Friesland where her boyfriend resides, was cast after meeting the writers on one of her visits. (As the World Turns also aired in the Netherlands and Hubbard was already well-known there as a result.)

In 2015, Hubbard appeared as Eva Montgomery on the soap opera web series Anacostia. She was nominated in 2016 for a Daytime Emmy for Outstanding Actress in a Digital Daytime Drama Series for the role.

Filmography

References

External links
 

Living people
Actresses from New York City
American stage actresses
American musical theatre actresses
American film actresses
American soap opera actresses
Daytime Emmy Award winners
Daytime Emmy Award for Outstanding Lead Actress in a Drama Series winners
Alumni of RADA
Radcliffe College alumni
21st-century American women
Year of birth missing (living people)